NSY is New Scotland Yard, London, UK.

NSY may also refer to:
Naval Air Station Sigonella's IATA code
Neoxanthin synthase, an enzyme